Robert Luketic (born 14 August 1971) is an Australian film director. His films include Legally Blonde (2001), Monster-in-Law (2005), 21 (2008), Killers (2010), and Paranoia (2013).

Early life
Robert Luketic was born in Sydney, Australia, the elder of two children of a Croatian father and Italian mother.

Career
Luketic started making short films as a teenager and went on to study at the Victorian College of Arts – School of Film and Television (VCA).

He first attracted Hollywood's attention with his award-winning short film Titsiana Booberini written by Tania Lacy. After screening to much acclaim at several festivals within Australia, Titsiana Booberini became a hit at many internationally renowned festivals including the Sundance Film Festival. It won "Best Film" at the Aspen Shortsfest.

Luketic directed the comedy Legally Blonde for MGM in the summer of 2001. This film, which grossed close to $100 million domestically and was nominated for two Golden Globe Awards, marked Luketic's feature film directing debut.

Next, Luketic directed the DreamWorks Pictures film Win a Date with Tad Hamilton!. The 2003 film, produced by Doug Wick and Lucy Fisher at Red Wagon, stars Kate Bosworth, Nathan Lane, Josh Duhamel and Topher Grace. In 2005, he directed Monster-in-Law, starring Jennifer Lopez, Jane Fonda, and Michael Vartan.

In 2008, Luketic released 21, based on the book Bringing Down the House by Ben Mezrich. The film tells the true story of five MIT students who became experts at counting cards and subsequently took Vegas casinos for millions in winnings. The film stars Kevin Spacey, Kate Bosworth, Jim Sturgess, and Laurence Fishburne. 

He directed the romantic comedy The Ugly Truth, which opened in July 2009. Starring Katherine Heigl and Gerard Butler, the film follows a morning show producer (Heigl) who sets out to disprove the outrageous relationship theories of her chauvinistic correspondent (Butler). Luketic next directed the action-comedy Killers, starring Heigl and Ashton Kutcher.

Filmography
 Titsiana Booberini (1997) (short film)
 Legally Blonde (2001)
 Win a Date with Tad Hamilton! (2004)
 Monster-in-Law (2005)
 21 (2008)
 The Ugly Truth (2009)
 Killers (2010)
 Paranoia (2013)
 The Wedding Year (2019)

References

External links
 
 robluketic.com

1973 births
Australian film directors
Australian people of Croatian descent
Australian people of Italian descent
People from Sydney
Living people
Victorian College of the Arts alumni